A wimple is a medieval form of female headcovering, formed of a large piece of cloth worn draped around the neck and chin, covering the top of the head; it was usually made from white linen or silk. Its use developed in early medieval Europe; in medieval Christianity it was unseemly for a married woman to show her hair. A wimple might be elaborately starched, creased and folded in prescribed ways. Later elaborate versions were supported on wire or wicker framing, such as the cornette.

Italian women abandoned their head coverings in the 15th century or replaced them with transparent gauze, showing their braids. Elaborate braiding and elaborately laundered clothes demonstrated status, because such grooming was performed by others. Today a plain wimple  is worn by the nuns of certain orders who retain a traditional habit.

In literature
The Wife of Bath and the Prioress are depicted wearing wimples in the Canterbury Tales of Geoffrey Chaucer (c. 1343–1400).

The King James Version of the Bible explicitly lists wimples in Isaiah 3:22 as one of a list of female fineries; however, the Hebrew word  means "kerchief".

See also
 Headpiece
 Headscarf 
 Veil
 Guimpe

References

History of clothing (Western fashion)
Catholic religious clothing
Headgear
Medieval European costume
Belarusian clothing
Religious headgear
Ukrainian clothing